Lambert Adelot (born 14 June 1898, date of death unknown) was a Belgian field hockey player who competed in the 1928 Summer Olympics and in the 1936 Summer Olympics.

He was a member of the Belgian field hockey team which finished fourth in the 1928 Olympic tournament. He played all five matches as halfback.

Eight years later he was part of the Belgian team which was eliminated in the first round of the 1936 Olympic tournament. He played all three matches.

External links
 
profile

1898 births
Year of death missing
Belgian male field hockey players
Olympic field hockey players of Belgium
Field hockey players at the 1928 Summer Olympics
Field hockey players at the 1936 Summer Olympics